Carige is a genus of moths in the family Geometridae.

Species
Carige duplicaria (Walker, 1862)
Carige cruciplaga (Walker, 1861)  (from India)
Carige lunulineata  Moore,  1888 (from India)
Carige rachiaria Swinhoe, 1891 (from India)

References

 Carige at Markku Savela's Lepidoptera and Some Other Life Forms
 Natural History Museum Lepidoptera genus database

Trichopterygini
Geometridae genera